Allison Brashear is an American neurologist. As of October 2021, she has accepted a position as Vice President for Health Sciences and Dean of the Jacobs School of Medicine and Biomedical Sciences at the University at Buffalo, New York. Her last day as dean of the UC Davis School of Medicine is November 12, 2021 and she previously served as the Walter C. Teagle Endowed Chair of Neurology at Wake Forest School of Medicine.

Early life and education
Brashear was born into a medical family; her father was a pulmonologist and her mother held a PhD in marriage and family therapy. She attended Park Tudor School in Indiana and later earned their Distinguished Alumni award. Following high school, Brashear earned her Bachelor of Science degree in Chemistry from DePauw University in 1983 and earned her medical degree from Indiana University School of Medicine.

Career
Upon earning her medical degree from Indiana University School of Medicine, Brashear stayed at the institution as a professor of neurology until 2005. During her tenure at Indiana University, Brashear was the first person to show that Botulinum toxin improved spasticity in wrists and fingers in stroke patients. As a result of her research, she was chosen to succeed B. Todd Troost as chairwoman of the Department of Neurology at  Wake Forest School of Medicine.

While working at Wake Forest, Brashear continued her studies on Botulinum toxin and was selected to develop new guidelines on the use of Botox by American Academy of Neurology. In 2008, the guidelines released by the organization confirmed that botox was safe and effective for treating a variety of neurological conditions. In the same year, she was also elected to the board of directors of Wake Forest University Baptist Medical Center and the recipient of the 2008 Community Leadership Award. Brashear expanded her research beyond Botulinum toxin and earned a grant from the National Institute of Neurological Disorders and Stroke to study the genetic mutation of ATP1A3. The results of her research project, which surveyed 56 individuals, found that there was a shared genetic link between psychiatric problems and movement disorders.

In 2019, Brashear left Wake Forest to become the Dean of the UC Davis School of Medicine by Chancellor Gary S. May. While serving in this role, she has sat on the American Board of Psychiatry and Neurology, the American Neurological Association, the American Academy of Neurology, and the California Institute for Regenerative Medicine Board. During the COVID-19 pandemic in North America, Brashear was elected to the McKnight Brain Research Foundation board to work to alleviate age-related memory loss.

Brashear's last day as the Dean of the UC Davis School of Medicine was November 12, 2021. She accepted a position as Vice President for Health Sciences and Dean of the Jacobs School of Medicine and Biomedical Sciences at the University at Buffalo, New York.

Personal life
Brashear is married to attorney Clifford Ong and they have two children together.

References

External links

Living people
American neurologists
Women neurologists
Fuqua School of Business alumni
DePauw University alumni
Indiana University School of Medicine alumni
University of California, Davis faculty
Wake Forest University faculty
Indiana University School of Medicine faculty
21st-century American women physicians
21st-century American physicians
Year of birth missing (living people)
American women academics